Ackomokki or A-ca-oo-mah-ca-ye (Blackfoot syllabics: , meaning Old Swan), was the name of three Siksiká chiefs between the late 1700s and 1860.

Ackomokki/Old Swan (I)
The first Ackomokki was described by Duncan M'Gillivray, the North West Company clerk at Fort George, as "once the greatest  of this Nation and was respected and esteemed by all neighboring tribes." By the time Ackomokki was chief, the Blackfoot/Plains Confederacy had consolidated power throughout he plains of what is modern-day Montana, Alberta, and western Saskatchewan. He was known as a peacemaker who was open to trade with Europeans. Ackomokki realized that establishing a direct relationship with Euro-Canadian traders would benefit the Siksiká by bypassing Cree and Assiniboine middlemen. As he grew older, Ackomokki was forced to step aside as chief, but he remained a respected elder of the tribe until his death following a fall in 1795.

Ackomokki/Old Swan (II)/Feathers
Ackomokki's son was known to fur traders as "Feathers" (or "Painted Feathers"). After his father's death he adopted the name Ackomokki, although Europeans continued to call him "Feathers" or "Many Swans" to distinguish him from his father. The elder Ackomokki's retirement led to a dispute over the tribe's leadership between the younger Ackomokki and Big Man/Gros Blanc (O-mok-a-pee), who struck a more hostile position toward white traders and other Native American tribes. Despite his early success as a warrior and hunter, younger Ackomokki adopted his father's policies and worked to preserve peace among his people and the neighboring Cree and Assiniboine peoples, as well as with European traders. By contrast, Big Man was openly hostile to other tribes and European traders, going so far as to participate in the 1793 Gros Ventre attack on the Hudson Bay Company's Manchester House.

In 1800, Ackomokki allowed the Hudson's Bay Company to establish the Chesterfield House trading post within the Blackfoot's wintering grounds at the confluence of the Red Deer and South Saskatchewan Rivers. By 1810, Ackomokki was recognized as leader of at least 60 percent of the Siksiká. However, changes in the balance of power between the Blackfoot and neighboring tribes brought on in part by westward expansion of U.S. traders lead to increasing conflicts and military decline for the Siksiká.

Around 1801, the younger Ackomokki drew for Hudson Bay Company surveyor Peter Fidler a detailed map of the lands around the Upper Missouri, including names of rivers, mountains, and peaks and travel time between them and information about 32 tribes populating the region. These drawings were later incorporated into the 1802 edition of Aaron Arrowsmith's map of the Interior Parts of North America. Ackomokki's maps included significant details about the topography and inhabitants of the area, which proved helpful in expanding the Hudson's Bay Company activities in the region.

In October 1814, Hudson Bay Company trader James Bird reported that Ackomokki had been shot and killed by "a man of their own nation but of another Tribe," likely a Kainai or Peigan.

Ackomokki/Old Swan (III)
A third Old Swan, possibly a son or nephew of the younger Ackomokki, assumed leadership of what was called by Europeans "Old Feathers' Band" by 1822. He was described in 1858 by Dr. James Hector as one of the three principal chiefs of the Blackfoot Confederacy (the other two being Crowfoot and Na-to-sa-pi), and, in July 1859, the Palliser Expedition were guests at his encampment on the Red Deer River.

References

19th-century deaths
Siksika Nation people
indigenous leaders in Alberta
Native American leaders
people of Rupert's Land
pre-Confederation Alberta people
year of birth unknown